Vice Admiral Sir Stuart Sumner Bonham Carter,  (9 July 1889 – 5 September 1972) was an officer in the Royal Navy who served in both the First and Second World Wars.

Naval career
Born the younger son of Lothian Bonham-Carter and Emily Maud Sumner, Bonham Carter joined the Royal Navy in 1904. He served in the First World War, commanding the block ship  during the Zeebrugge Raid in 1918. He also commanded the destroyer  in the closing stages of the war.

A keen cricketer, Bonham Carter played two first-class matches for the Royal Navy Cricket Club in 1925. He was appointed Chief of Staff to the Commander-in-Chief, Africa in 1928, and made Assistant Director for Navy Equipment in 1932 before becoming Chief Staff Officer to the commander of the 1st Cruiser Squadron in 1934. He was given command of the Royal Naval Barracks at Chatham in 1937 and made Naval Secretary in 1939.

Bonham Carter also served in the Second World War, commanding the 3rd Battle Squadron from 1940 and the 18th Cruiser Squadron from 1942. It is said that he had something of a reputation of being a Jonah in any cruiser in which he raised his Admiral's flag, as these kept being sunk from under his feet. He was made Flag Officer, Malta in 1942 and retired due to ill health in 1943, although he was recalled in 1944 to lead naval convoys.

Family
In 1933 Bonham Carter married Eve Lloyd; they had one child, Joanna. He is distantly related to the actress Helena Bonham Carter.

There is a memorial to Bonham Carter at St Mary's Church, Buriton.

See also
 Bonham Carter family

References

|-

Royal Navy officers
Royal Navy vice admirals
Royal Navy personnel of World War I
Royal Navy personnel of World War II
English cricketers
People educated at Clifton College
Royal Navy cricketers
1889 births
1972 deaths
People from Petersfield
Knights Commander of the Order of the Bath
Commanders of the Royal Victorian Order
Stuart
People from Buriton
Military personnel from Portsmouth